HMCS Porte St. Louis was a  gate vessel of the Royal Canadian Navy.

Construction and career
Porte St. Louis was built by George T. Davie & Sons, Lauzon, being laid down on 21 March 1951 and launched on 23 July 1952. She was commissioned on 29 August 1952 and like her sister ships, took the name of one of the gates in the fortifications of Quebec or Louisbourg.

Though the class were designed to operate the gates in anti-submarine booms, there was little need for this during the Cold War and most of the class was placed in reserve in the late 1950s. The class was reactivated in the mid-1960s and used as training vessels for personnel of the Canadian Forces Naval Reserve at Fleet School Hamilton, Ontario. Porte St. Louis was based at Halifax, Nova Scotia until being paid off on 1 September 1995 and disposed of.

References

Auxiliary ships of the Royal Canadian Navy
Porte-class gate vessels
1952 ships
Ships built in Quebec